The Canon AV-1 is a 35 mm single-lens reflex camera with an FD lens mount, introduced by Canon Inc. in 1979.

The AV-1 is very similar to the 1976 AE-1 but provides aperture priority autoexposure rather than the AE-1's shutter speed priority AE.  The camera is not capable of fully manual exposure.
Canon's international distributors, particularly in the United States, had clamored for such a camera because competing brands offered mostly aperture-priority cameras and some preferred it.  The AV in the name referred to the type of autoexposure; Av (Aperture Value) is a common abbreviation for aperture priority.

When this camera appeared, a new range of FD lenses was introduced, with instant mounting/unmounting of the lens. This is called the New FD mount and does away with the older type of mounting ring which was fitted on to the rear of the lens and was awkward to use and needed two hands, to a newer, easier system whereby the user lined up the red dot on the lens, with the red dot on the camera and simply turned the whole lens clockwise until it clicked into place.

All the other AE-1 accessories fit the AV-1.

References

External links

Canon Inc.
Canon AV-1 manual . Retrieved December 27, 2015.
 Canon AV-1 Camera at Photography of Malaysia

AV-1